h₂éwsōs or haéusōs (PIE: *h₂éusōs, *haéusōs and other variants; lit. 'the dawn') is the reconstructed Proto-Indo-European name of the dawn goddess in the Proto-Indo-European mythology.

h₂éwsōs is believed to have been one of the most important deities worshipped by Proto-Indo-European speakers due to the consistency of her characterization in subsequent traditions as well as the importance of the goddess Uṣas in the Rigveda.

Her attributes have not only been mixed with those of solar goddesses in some later traditions, most notably the Baltic sun-deity Saulė, but have subsequently expanded and influenced female deities in other mythologies.

Name

Etymology 
The reconstructed Proto-Indo-European name of the dawn, *h₂éwsōs, derives the verbal root *h₂(e)wes- ('to shine, glow red; a flame') extended by the suffix -ós-. The same root also underlies the word for 'gold', *h₂ews-om (lit. 'glow'), inherited in Latin aurum, Old Prussian ausis, and Lithuanian áuksas.

The word for the dawn as a meteorological event has also been preserved in Balto-Slavic *auṣ(t)ro (cf. Lith. aušrà 'dawn, morning light', PSlav. *ȕtro 'morning, dawn', OCS za ustra 'in the morning'), in Sanskrit uṣar ('dawn'), or in Ancient Greek αὔριον ('tomorrow').

A derivative adverb, *h₂ews-teros, meaning 'east' (lit. 'toward the dawn'), is reflected in Latvian àustrums ('east'), Avestan ušatara ('east'), Italic *aus-tero- (cf. Latin auster 'south wind, south'), Old Church Slavonic ustrŭ ('summer'), and Germanic *austeraz (cf. Old Norse austr, English east, MHG oster). The same root seems to be preserved in the Baltic names for the northeast wind: Lith. aūštrinis and Latv. austrenis, austrinis, austrinš. Also related are the Old Norse Austri, described in the Gylfaginning as one of four dwarves that guard the four cardinal points (with him representing the east), and Austrvegr ('The Eastern Way'), attested in medieval Germanic literature.

Epithets 
A common epithet associated with the Dawn is *Diwós Dhuǵh₂tḗr, the 'Daughter of Dyēus', the sky god. Cognates stemming from the formulaic expression appear in the following traditions:  'Daughter of Heaven' in the Rigveda (as an epithet of Uṣas), 'Daughter of Zeus' (probably associated with Ēṓs in pre-Homeric Greek), 'Daughter of Dievas' (an epithet transferred to a Sun-goddess in the Lithuanian folklore). Also in northern Albanian folk beliefs Prende, a dawn goddess, is regarded as the daughter of the sky god Zojz.

Depiction

Eternal rebirth 
The Dawn-goddess is sometimes portrayed as un-ageing and her coming as an eternal rebirth.

Colours 
A widespread characteristic given to the dawn h₂éwsōs is her 'brilliance' and she is generally described as a 'bringer of light'. Various cognates associated with the dawn-goddess indeed derive from the Proto-Indo-European root *bheh₂-, meaning 'to glow, shine'. The Vedic Uṣas is described as bhānty Usásah ('the Dawns shine'), the Avestan Ušå as uši ... bāmya ('shining dawn') and the Greek Ēṓs as φαινόλις ('light-bringing'), φαεσίμβροτος ('shining on mortals'), or λαμπρο-φαής ('bright-shining'), attested in an Orphic hymn to the Dawn.

h₂éwsōs is usually associated with the natural colours of the dawn: gold, saffron-yellow, red, or crimson. The Dawn is 'gold-coloured' (híraṇya-varṇā) in the Rigveda, 'the golden-yellow one' (flāua) in Ovid's Amores, and 'gold-throned' (khrysóthronos; χρυσόθρονος) in a Homeric formula. In Latvian folk songs, Saulė and her daughter(s) are dressed of shawls woven with gold thread, and Saulė wears shoes of gold, which parallels Sappho describing Ēṓs as 'golden-sandalled' (khrysopédillos; χρυσοπέδιλλος).

Ēṓs is also 'saffron-robed' (κροκόπεπλος) in Homeric poems, while Uṣás wears crimson (rose-red) garments and a "gleaming gold" veil. The Hindu goddess is also described as a red dawn shining from afar; "red, like a mare", she shoots "ruddy beams of light", "yokes red steeds to her car" or "harnesses the red cows" in the Samaveda. Saffron-yellow, red and purple are colours also associated with the Dawn by the Latin poet Ovid.

The Baltic Sun-goddess Saulė has preserved some of the imagery of h₂éwsōs, and she is sometimes portrayed as waking up 'red' (sārta) or 'in a red tree' during the morning. Saulé is also described as being dressed in clothes woven with "threads of red, gold, silver and white". In the Lithuanian tradition, the sun is portrayed as a "golden wheel" or a "golden circle" that rolls down the mountain at sunset. Also in Latvian riddles and songs, Saule is associated with the color red, as if to indicate the "fiery aspect" of the sun: the setting and the rising sun are equated with a rose wreath and a rose in bloom, due to their circular shapes.

According to Russian folklorist Alexander Afanasyev, the figure of the Dawn in Slavic tradition is varied: she is described in a Serbian folksong as a maiden sitting on a silver throne in the water, her legs of a yellow color and her arms of gold; in a Russian saying, the goddess Zorya is invoked as a "красная девица" (krasnaya dyevitsa, "red maiden"); in another story, the "red maiden" Zorya sits on a golden chair and holds a silver disk or mirror (identified as the sun); in another, a maiden sits on a white-hot stone (Alatyr) in Buyan, weaving red silk in one version, or the "rose-fingered" Zorya, with her golden needle, weaves over the sky a veil in rosy and "blood-red" colours using a thread of "yellow ore". She is also depicted as a beautiful golden-haired queen who lives in a golden kingdom "at the edge of the White World", and rows through the seas with her golden oar and silver boat.

Movements 
h₂éwsōs is frequently described as dancing: Uṣas throws on embroidered garments 'like a dancer' (nṛtūr iva), Ēṓs has 'dancing-places' (χοροί) around her house in the East, Saulė is portrayed as dancing in her gilded shoes on a silver hill, and her fellow Baltic goddess Aušrinė is said to dance on a stone for the people on the first day of summer. According to a Bulgarian tradition, on St. John's Day, the sun dances and "whirls swords about" (sends rays of light), whereas in Lithuania the Sun (identified as female) rides a car towards her husband, the Moon, "dancing and emitting fiery sparks" on the way.

The spread hand as the image of the sun's rays in the morning may also be of Proto-Indo-European origin. The Homeric expressions 'rose-armed' (rhodópēkhus; ῥοδόπηχυς) and 'rosy-fingered Dawn' (rhododáktylos Ēṓs; ῥοδοδάκτυλος Ἠώς), as well as Bacchylides' formula 'gold-armed' (khrysopakhús; χρυσοπαχύς), can be semantically compared with the Vedic formulas 'golden-handed' (híraṇyapāṇi-; हिरण्यपाणि) and 'broad-handed' (pṛthúpāṇi-; पृथुपाणि). They are also similar with Latvian poetic songs where the Sun-god's fingers are said to be 'covered with golden rings'. According to Martin L. West, "the 'rose' part is probably a Greek refinement."

Another trait ascribed to the Dawn is that she is "wide-shining" or "far-shining" - an attribute possibly attested in Greek theonym Euryphaessa ("wide-shining") and Sanskrit poetic expression urviyắ ví bhāti ('[Ushas] shines forth/shines out widely').

Dwelling 
Another common trait of the Dawn goddess is her dwelling, generally situated on an island in the Ocean, or sometimes in an Eastern house.

In Greek mythology, Ēṓs is described as living 'beyond the streams of Okeanos at the ends of the earth'. A more precise location is given in the Odyssey, by poet Homer: in his narration, Odysseus tells his audience that the Aeaean isle is "where is the dwelling of early Dawn and her dancing-lawns, and the risings of the sun".

In Slavic folklore, the home of the Zoryas was sometimes said to be on Bouyan (or Buyan), an oceanic island paradise where the Sun dwelt along with his attendants, the North, West and East winds.

The Avesta refers to a mythical eastern mountain called Ušidam- ('Dawn-house'). The Yasnas also mention a mountain named Ušidarɘna, possibly meaning "crack of dawn" (as a noun) or "having reddish cracks" (as an adjective).

In a myth from Lithuania, a man named Joseph becomes fascinated with Aušrinė appearing in the sky and goes on a quest to find the 'second sun', who is actually a maiden that lives on an island in the sea and has the same hair as the Sun. In the Baltic folklore, Saulė is said to live in a silver-gated castle at the end of the sea, located somewhere in the east, or to go to an island in the middle of the sea for her nocturnal rest. In folksongs, Saule sinks into the bottom of a lake to sleep at night, in a silver cradle "in the white seafoam".

Vehicle

Carrier 
The Dawn is often described as driving some sort of vehicle, probably originally a wagon or a similar carrier, certainly not a chariot as the technology appeared later within the Sintashta culture (2100–1800 BC), generally associated with the Indo-Iranian peoples. In the Odyssey, Ēṓs appears once as a charioteer, and the Vedic Uṣas yokes red oxen or cows, probably pictorial metaphors for the red clouds or rays seen at morning light. The vehicle is portrayed as a biga or a rosy-red quadriga in Virgil's Aeneid and in classical references from Greek epic poetry and vase painting, or as a shining chariot drawn by golden-red horses. According to Albanian folk beliefs the dawn goddess Prende is pulled across the sky in her chariot by swallows, called Pulat e Zojës "the Lady's Birds", which are connected to the chariot by the rainbow (Ylberi) that the people also call Brezi or Shoka e Zojës "the Lady's Belt".

Saulė, a sun-goddess syncrethized with the Dawn, also drives a carriage with copper-wheels, a "gleaming copper chariot" or a golden chariot pulled by untiring horses, or a 'pretty little sleigh' (kamaņiņa) made of fish-bones. Saulė is also described as driving her shining car on the way to her husband, the Moon. In other accounts, she is said to sail the seas on a silver or a golden boat, which, according to legend, is what her chariot transforms into for her night travels. In a Latvian folksong, Saule hangs her sparkling crown on a tree in the evening and enters a golden boat to sail away.

In old Slavic fairy tales, the Dawn-Maiden (Zora-djevojka) "sails the sea in the early morning in her boat of gold with a silver paddle" (alternatively, a silver boat with golden oars) and sails back to Buyan, the mysterious island where she dwells.

Horses 
The Dawn's horses are also mentioned in several Indo-European poetical traditions. Homer's Odyssey describes the horses of Ēṓs as a pair of swift steeds named Lampos and Phaethon, and Bacchylides calls her 'white-horsed Dawn' (λεύκιππος Ἀώς). The vehicle is sometimes portrayed as being drawn by golden-red horses. The colours of Dawn's horses are said to be "pale red, ruddy, yellowish, reddish-yellow" in the Vedic tradition.

Baltic sun-goddess Saulė's horses are said to be of a white color; in other accounts they amount to three steeds of golden, silver and diamond colors. In Latvian dainas (folk songs), her horses are described as yellow, of a golden or a fiery color. The sun's steeds are also portrayed as having hooves and bridles of gold in the dainas, and as golden beings themselves or of a bay colour, "reflect[ing] the hues of the bright or the twilight sky". When she begins her nocturnal journey through the World Sea, her chariot changes into a boat and "the Sun swims her horses", which signifies that "she stops to wash her horses in the sea". Scholarship points that the expressions geltoni žirgeliai or dzelteni kumeliņi ('golden' or 'yellow horses'), which appear in Latvian dainas, seem to be a recurrent poetic motif.

Although Zorya of Slavic mythology does not appear to feature in stories with a chariot or wagon pulled by horses, she is still described in a tale as preparing the "fiery horses" of her brother, the Sun, at the beginning and at the end of the day.

Role

Opener of the doors of heaven 
h₂éwsōs is often depicted as the opener of the doors or gates of her father the heaven (*Dyēus): the Baltic verse pie Dieviņa namdurēm ('by the doors of the house of God'), which Saulė is urged to open to the horses of the son(s) of God, is lexically comparable with the Vedic expression dvā́rau ... Diváḥ ('doors of Heaven'), which Uṣas opens with her light. Another parallel could be made with the 'shining doors' (θύρας ... φαεινάς) of the home of Ēṓs, behind which she locks up her lover Tithonus as he grows old and withers in Homer's Hymn to Aphrodite.

A similar poetic imagery is present among Classical poets, although some earlier Greek source may lie behind these. In Ovid's Metamorphoses, Aurōra opens the red doors (purpureas fores) to fill her rosy halls, and in Nonnus' Dionysiaca the Dawn-goddess shakes off her sleep and leaves Kephalos' repose in order to 'open the gates of sunrise' (ἀντολίης ὤιξε θύρας πολεμητόκος Ἠώς).

Other reflexes may also be present in other Indo-European traditions. In Slavic folklore, the goddess of the dawn Zorya Utrennyaya open the palace's gates for her father Dažbog's (a Slavic Sun god) journey during the day. Her sister Zorya Vechernyaya, the goddess of dusk, closes them at the end of the day. In a passage of the Eddas about Dellingr, a Norse deity of light, a dwarf utters a charm or incantation in front of 'Delling's doors' (fyr Dellings durum), which apparently means "at dawn".

According to scholarship, Lithuanian folklore attests a similar dual role for luminous deities Vakarine and Ausrine, akin to Slavic Zoryas (although it lacks the door imagery):<ref>Razauskas, Dainius. "Iš baltų mitinio vaizdyno juodraščių: Aušrinė (ir Vakarinė)" [From rough copies of the Baltic mythic imagery: the Morning Star]. In: Liaudies kultūra'. Nr. 6 (201), pp. 17-25.</ref> Vakarine, the Evening Star, made the bed for solar goddess Saulė, and Aušrinė, the Morning Star, lit the fire for her as she prepared for another day's journey. In another account, they are Saulé's daughters and tend their mother's palace and horses.

 Reluctant bringer of light 
In Indo-European myths, h₂éwsōs is frequently depicted as a reluctant bringer of light for which she is punished. This theme is widespread in the attested traditions: Ēṓs and Aurōra are sometimes unwilling to leave her bed, Uṣas is punished by Indra for attempting to forestall the day, and Auseklis did not always rise in the morning, as she was said to be locked up in a golden chamber or in Germany sewing velvet skirts.

The Divine Twins are often said to rescue the Dawn from a watery peril, a theme that emerged from their role as the solar steeds.

 Evidence 
 Dawn-goddesses 

Cognates stemming from the root *h₂éwsōs and associated with a dawn-goddess are attested in the following mythologies:
 PIE: *h₂(e)wes-, meaning "to shine, light up, glow red; a flame", PIE: *h₂éws-ōs, the Dawn-goddess,Indo-Iranian: *Hušas,
Vedic: Uṣás (उषस्), the dawn-goddess, and the most addressed goddess in the Rigveda, with twenty-one hymns,Avestan: Ušå, honoured in one passage of the Avesta (Gāh 5. 5), and Ušahina, the special Angel of the time separating midnight from the moment when the stars can become visible.
Hellenic: *Auhṓs,Greek: Ēṓs, the goddess of the dawn, and Aotis, an epithet used by the Spartan poet Alcman and interpreted as a dawn goddess.
Ancient Greek literature: fragments of works of poet Panyassis of Halicarnassus mention epithets Eoies ("He of the Dawn") and Aoos ("man of the Dawn") in reference to Adonis, as a possible indicator of his Eastern origin;Greek Epic Fragments: From the Seventh to the Fifth Century. Edited and Translated by Martin L. West. London, England; Cambridge, Massachusetts: Harvard University Press. 2003. pp. 216-217.  the name Aoos also appears as a son of Eos;
Mycenaean: the word a-wo-i-jo (Āw(ʰ)oʰios; Ἀϝohιος) is attested in a tablet from Pylos; interpreted as a shepherd's personal name related to "dawn",Nakassis, Dimitri. "Labor and Individuals in Late Bronze Age Pylos". In: Labor in the Ancient World. Edited by Piotr Steinkeller and Michael Hudson. Dresden: ISLET-Verlag. 2015 [2005]. p. 605. .Jorro, Francisco Aura. "Reflexiones sobre el léxico micénico" In:  Conuentus Classicorum: temas y formas del Mundo Clásico. Coord. por Jesús de la Villa, Emma Falque Rey, José Francisco González Castro, María José Muñoz Jiménez, Vol. 1, 2017, pp. 307. . or dative Āwōiōi;
Italic: *Ausōs > *Ausōs-ā (with an a-stem extension likely explained by the feminine gender),Roman: Aurōra, whose attributes are a mirror reflection of the Greek deity; the original motif of *h₂éwsōs may have been preserved in Mater Matuta; Eous or Eoös, an obscure poetic term meaning 'east' or 'oriental', is attested in Lucan's Pharsalia, in Hyginus's Fabulae, in the lost epic of the Titanomachy, and as the name given to one of the Sun's horses in Ovid's Metamorphoses,Rose, H. J. A Handbook of Greek Mythology. London and New York: Routledge. 2005 [1928]. p. 25. . 
 PIE: *h₂ws-s-i, locative singular of *h₂éwsōs,
Armenian (Proto): *aw(h)i-, evolving as *awi̯ -o-, then *ayɣwo-,
Armenian: Ayg (այգ), the Dawn-goddess.
Germanic: *Auzi/a-wandalaz, a personal name generally interpreted as meaning 'light-beam' or 'ray of light',
Old Norse: Aurvandil, whose frozen toe was made into a star by Thor,
Old English: Ēarendel, meaning "dawn, ray of light",
Old High German: Aurendil, Orentil; Lombardic: Auriwandalo,
Gothic: auzandil (𐌰𐌿𐌶𐌰𐌽𐌳𐌹𐌻), Morning Star, Lucifer ("light-bringer"),
PIE: *h₂ews-rom (or *h₂ews-reh₂), "matutinal, pertaining to the dawn",
Balto-Slavic: *Auṣ(t)ro,
Baltic: *Auš(t)ra, "dawn",
Lithuanian: Aušrinė, personification of the Morning Star (Venus), said to begin each day by lighting a fire for the sun; Aušra (sometimes Auska), goddess of sunrise, given as the answer to a Baltic riddle about a maiden who loses her keys; and Auštra (interpreted as "dawn" or "northeast wind"), a character in a fable that guards the entry to paradise,
Latvian: Auseklis (ausa "dawn" attached to the derivative suffix -eklis), personification of the Morning Star, and a reluctant goddess of the dawn; female personal names include Ausma and Austra;Palmaitis, M.-L. "Romeo Moses and Psyche Brünhild? Or Cupid the Serpent and the Morning Star?". In: Paris, Catherine (éditeur). Caucasologie et mythologie comparée, Actes du Colloque international du C.N.R.S. - IVe Colloque de Caucasologie (Sévres, 27 - 29 juin 1988). Paris: PEETERS. 1992. p. 181.  words ausma and ausmiņa denoting "Morgendämmerung" ('dawn, daybreak');
Slavic: *(j)ȕtro, "morning, dawn",
Polish: Jutrzenka or Justrzenka; Czech: Jitřenka, name and personification of Morning Star and Evening Star,
Polabians: Jutrobog (Latin: Jutry Bog or Jutrny Boh), literally "Morning God", a deity mentioned by German historians in the 18th century, and Jüterbog: a town in east Germany named after the Slavic god,
Historically, the Kashubians (in Poland) were described to worship Jastrzebog and the goddess Jastra, who was worshipped in Jastarnia, from which the Kashubian term for Easter, Jastrë, was derived. These names may be related with Polabian god Jutrobog, be influenced by Proto-Germanic deity *Austrōn (see below), or may come from the word jasny ('bright').
Germanic: *Austrōn, goddess of the springtime celebrated during a yearly festival, at the origin of the word 'Easter' in some West Germanic languages,
Romano-Germanic: matronae Austriahenae, a name present in votive inscriptions found in 1958 in Germany.
Old English: Ēastre, personification of Easter,
Old High German: *Ōstara (pl. Ôstarûn), personification of Easter (Modern German: Ostern),
Old Saxon: *Āsteron, possibly attested in the name asteronhus ('Easter-house').

 Epithets 
The formulaic expression "Daughter of Dyēus" is attested as an epithet attached to a dawn-goddess in several poetic traditions:
 PIE: *diwós dhuǵhatḗr, "Daughter of Dyēus",
Vedic: duhitā́r-diváh, "Daughter of Heaven", epithet of Uṣas, Greek: thugátēr Diós, "Daughter of Zeus", probably a pre-Homeric Greek epithet of Ēṓs, Lithuanian: dievo dukra, "Daughter of Dievas", epithet of the Sun-goddess which likely took the attributes of h₂éwsōs. Poetic and liturgic formula 
An expression of formulaic poetry can be found in the Proto-Indo-European expression *h₂(e)ws-sḱeti ("it dawns"), attested in Lithuanian aušta and aũšti, Latvian àust, Avestan usaitī, or Sanskrit ucchāti. The poetic formula 'the lighting dawn' is also attested in the Indo-Iranian tradition: Sanskrit uchantīm usásam, and Young Avestan usaitīm uṣ̌ā̊ŋhəm. A hapax legomenon uşád-bhiḥ (instr. pl.) is also attested.

Other remnants of the root *h₂éws- are present in the Zoroastrian prayer to the dawn Hoshbām, and in Ušahin gāh (the dawn watch), sung between midnight and dawn. In Persian historical and sacred literature, namely, the Bundahishn, in the chapter about the genealogy of the Kayanid dynasty, princess Frānag, in exile with "Frēdōn's Glory" after escaping her father's murderous intentions, promises to give her firstborn son, Kay Apiweh, to "Ōšebām". Ōšebām, in return, saves Franag. In the Yasht about Zam, the Angel of the Munificent Earth, a passage reads upaoṣ̌ā̊ŋhə ('situated in the rosy dawn'), "a hypostatic derivation from unattested **upa uṣ̌āhu 'up in the morning light(s)'".

A special carol, zorile ("dawn"), was sung by the colindători (traditional Romanian singers) during funerals, imploring the Dawns not be in a hurry to break, or begging them to prevent the dead from departing this world. The word is of Slavic origin, with the term for 'dawn' attached to the Romanian article -le.

Stefan Zimmer suggests that Welsh literary expression ym bronn y dyd ("at the breast/bosom of the day") is an archaic formula possibly referring to the Dawn goddess, who bared her breast.

 Legacy 
According to linguist Václav Blažek, the Albanian word (h)yll ("star") finds a probable etymology in the root *h₂ews- ('dawn'), perhaps specifically in *h₂ws-li ('morning-star'). Scholars have also argued that the Roman name Aurēlius (originally Ausēlius, from Sabine *ausēla 'sun') and the Etruscan sun god Usil (probably of Osco-Umbrian origin) may be related to the Indo-European word for the dawn. A figure in Belarusian tradition named Аўсень (Ausenis) and related to the coming of spring is speculated to be cognate to *Haeusos.

Remnants of the root *haeus and its derivations survive in onomastics of the Middle Ages. A medieval French obituary from the 12th century, from Moissac, in Occitania, registers compound names of Germanic origin that contain root Aur- (e.g., Auraldus) and Austr- (e.g., Austremonius, Austrinus, Austris). Names of Frankish origin are attested in a "polyptyque" of the Abbey of Saint-Germain-des-Prés, containing aust- (sometimes host- or ost-) and austr- (or ostr- > French out-). Germanic personal names in Galicia and Iberian toponyms with prefix aus-, astr- and aust- (> ost-) also attest the survival of the root well into medieval times.Iglesias, Hector. "Aztarna germanikoa Euskal Herriko toponimia historikoan". In: Fontes Linguae Vasconum: Studia et documenta. Institución Príncipe de Viana - Gobierno de Navarra, 2001. p. 328. ffartxibo-00000108 (In Basque)Iglesias, Hector. "Toponymes portugais, galiciens, asturiens et pyrénéens: affinités et problèmes historico-linguistiques". In: Nouvelle revue d'onomastique, n°35-36, 2000. p. 133. [DOI: https://doi.org/10.3406/onoma.2000.1370]; www.persee.fr/doc/onoma_0755-7752_2000_num_35_1_1370

A character named Gwawrdur is mentioned in the Mabinogion tale of Culhwch and Olwen. Stefan Zimmer suggests either a remnant of the Dawn goddess or a name meaning "(with) the color of steel", since gwawr may also mean 'color, hue, shade'. The name also appears in the Canu Aneirin under the variants Gwardur, Guaurud, Guaurdur, (G)waredur, or (G)waledur. All of these stem from the Middle Welsh gwawr ('dawn'; also 'hero, prince'). According to linguist Ranko Matasović, the latter derives from Proto-Celtic *warī- ('sunrise, east', cf. MIr. fáir), itself from the PIE root *wōsr- ('Spring').

 Influences 
According to Michael Witzel, the Japanese goddess of the dawn Uzume, revered in Shinto, was  influenced by Vedic religion. It has been suggested by anthropologist Kevin Tuite that Georgian goddess Dali also shows several parallels with Indo-European dawn goddesses.

A possible mythological descendant of the Indo-European dawn goddess may be Aphrodite, the Greek goddess of love and lust. Scholars posit similarities based on her connection with a sky deity as her father (Zeus or Uranus) and her association with red and gold colours. In the Iliad, Aphrodite is hurt by a mortal and seeks solace in her mother's (Dione) bosom. Dione is seen as a female counterpart to Zeus and is thought to etymologically derive from Proto-Indo-European root *Dyeus.

Footnotes

References

Bibliography

Further reading
 Di Benedetto, Vincenzo. "Osservazioni Intorno a *αυσ- E *αιερι." Glotta 61, no. 3/4 (1983): 149–64. Accessed June 5, 2020. www.jstor.org/stable/40266630.
 
 Wandl, Florian (2019). "On the Slavic Word for ‘Morning’: *(j)u(s)tro". In: Scando-Slavica'', 65:2, pp. 263–281.

External links

 

 
Proto-Indo-European deities
Reconstructed words
Sky and weather goddesses
Proto-Indo-European mythology
Dawn goddesses